The Hampton Downs Motorsport Park is situated in rural northern Waikato (about halfway between Auckland and Hamilton on the Waikato Expressway), New Zealand near the Meremere drag strip and the dirt track club.

History
The motorsport park is an ambitious privately funded enterprise by two motorsport friends, Tony Roberts and Chris Watson. Roberts and Watson purchased two dairy farms from Envirowaste in December 2003 and began the long task of getting resource consent to build the Motorsport Park. The concept of apartments on the edge of the circuit was entirely new and untested in the market. Roberts and Watson came up with the concept from observing its success alongside golf courses to help fund the project. It was a major success, with the 80 apartments selling in only 5 weeks in 2006 and returning $26 million to help fund the project. With construction beginning in February 2007. The completion was planned for late 2008, but a particularly wet winter pushed the opening out to October 2009. Some of the circuit was built on swampy ground, and Fraser Thomas Ltd, the engineers on the project utilised modern pre-loading technology to ensure that the land would be stable enough to support a race track. The earthworks were carried out by Ross Reid Ltd, who purchased laser controlled graders to ensure an accurate build of the circuit. In January 2010 Hampton Downs was officially opened by the Waikato District Mayor, Peter Harris, at the Bruce McLaren Festival. This Festival was the first of the very successful Historic Motorsport Festival promoted to celebrate a famous New Zealander, or car marque. Hampton Downs has become a major venue for local motorsport without the restrictions imposed by tracks that share the use with the horse racing fraternity like Pukekohe Park Raceway. It also reflects a modern approach to motor race track design and associated amenities. The 160ha development's initial plans also included an industrial park, events cafe, motor lodge, lifestyle blocks, 80-trackside apartments and convention centre (re-located Britomart Pavilion) and the track is already booked out five days a week for driver training and various industry promotions.

In 2015, Tony Quinn purchased the complex and work started almost immediately to complete the circuit extension, based very much on the original plans. Currently completed are the hospitality suites above the pits, a corporate karting circuit, business park, business apartments (with seven-car garages) and cafe. The Bruce McLaren Trust has an industrial unit with a large collection of the famous NZ racing driver and originator of the McLaren F1 team memorabilia, which can be viewed most days.

In 2020, the track should have hosted the Supercars Championship's Auckland Super400 but the lockdown due to COVID-19 curtailed this. Although the event is traditionally held at Pukekohe Park Raceway, the 2020 race was scheduled for Anzac Day (25 April), which is forbidden under local legislation.

Hampton Downs is one of the most technically advanced race circuit in the world, with complete integration between race control, start lights, flag point lights, pit lane lights, CCTV system, timing systems, environmental sound monitoring, pit lane speed monitoring and large outdoor LED information displays. Most day-to-day operations are now fully automated including a vehicle safety system that monitors all vehicles on track and alerts the operator within 30sec if a vehicle stops on track.

The circuit
The track consists of two independent circuits that can be combined to form one large circuit. The direction of the circuits are clockwise. The track has a very smooth surface, and a mix of blind bends and crests which make it a challenging circuit for drivers. Both tracks can combine into a  circuit with six right-hand and four left-hand corners.

Accommodation
The  includes 80-trackside apartments set in four blocks on the main straight, all of which were sold out within three weeks during September 2004. Many of the apartments are offered to rent as part of a motel and are able to accommodate up to six people. Ultimately, the complex will include a swimming pool, tennis court, fitness club and restaurant for the use of residents and guests.

Track facilities and specification
The track has been designed for FIA Level 2 usage, which is just one step below Formula One. Apart from racing, there will be an emphasis on the testing and driver training facility. Downforce will run driver training (instructed by A1GP veteran Jonny Reid) and corporate events at Hampton Downs. California Superbike School have signed up and base its New Zealand fleet of Suzuki GSX-R600s at Hampton Downs to deliver professional rider training between-races events at Hampton Downs, as an extension of its worldwide network.

Virtual models

Demonstrations
The track had been modeled in 3D by Rmedia featuring a BMW Formula One car. Its full simulation also had been analyzed by FIA.

Games
The Hampton Downs circuit was immortalised in the rFactor game by way of third-party generated content based on the early plans made before construction was initially complete. This content is available to download for public use.

Track events 
The track has hosted several major events since it opened in 2009. The circuit also hosts a round of the Toyota Racing Series each summer (except 2022), with three races being held during the event and the New Zealand Motor Cup being contested over the final race. The V8SuperTourer series held two yearly events at the circuit from its inception until its demise. The newly formed NZ Touring Car Championship now contests there annually. Many other events are held other the year including national events as well as local events. The circuit also hosts the New Zealand Grand Prix in 2021 and 2023.

It also hosted the 2016 Hampton Downs 101, an endurance race as part of the 2016 Australian GT Championship.

Lap Records

The fastest official race lap records at the Hampton Downs Motorsport Park are listed as:

Notes

References

External links
 

Motorsport venues in New Zealand
Sports venues in Waikato
Supercars Championship circuits
2009 establishments in New Zealand
Sports venues completed in 2009